Alegria, officially the Municipality of Alegria,  is a 4th class municipality in the province of Cebu, Philippines. According to the 2020 census, it has a population of 25,620 people.

It is home of the first onshore oil field in the Philippines, the Alegria Oil Field.

History

Timeline:
Pre-1850: Native tribe; then a Spanish-era barrio called Tuburan after the spring (tubod) located at sitio Tubig (Santa Rosa) in the poblacion.
 31 January 1850: Leaders of Tuburan ask Governor of Cebu to support their petition for civil separation from mother town (matriz) Malabuyoc.
4 February: Malabuyoc leaders send letter of support for said petition. Tuburan had a church made of tabique de pampango, a convent and tribunal of light materials, two rubble watchtowers and 410½ tributos ( 
15 February: Petition goes to the Civil Administrator and Commanding General of the Visayas then sent to Superior Government in Manila.
31 March: Assessor General recommends approval of said petition.
3 April: Captain and Governor-General of the Philippine Islands (Antonio María Blanco) approves establishment of Tuburan as a town.
24 August: Governor of Cebu recommends changing the town's name to avoid confusing it with similarly named barrios in Balamban and Bogo.
25 September: Captain and Governor-General of the Philippines (Antonio de Urbistondo y Eguía) issues order changing the town's name to Alegria.

Establishment of parish:
9 August 1854: The Padre Cura of Malabuyoc, Lucas Clavesillas de la Soledad recommends to the Bishop of Cebu (Romualdo Jimeno Ballesteros, O.P.) the creation of Alegria as a parish.
17 September: Governor of Cebu proposes separating barrio Guiuanon (Madridejos) from Badian and adding it to Alegria to form a new parish territory.
31 October: Bishop of Cebu supports creation of said territory.
10 November: Bishop informs Governor of Cebu that Badian does not object to creation of a new parish and separation of Guiuanon.
21 February 1856: Petition for said separation and the creation of new parish territory received by the Minister of Royal Treasury in Manila.
27 February: Governor of Cebu asks the Captain and Governor-General to create said parish.
3 July: the town of Alegria created as a parish. Tributes: 781 (Poblacion - 521½, Guiuanon - 259½)

13 March 1857: Parish of Alegria Canonically erected. Titular St. Francis Xavier Feast 3 Dec.

Geography
Alegira is bordered to the north by the town of Badian, to the west is the Tañon Strait, to the east are the towns of Dalaguete and Alcoy, and to the south is the town of Malabuyoc.

Barangays

Alegria comprises 9 barangays:

Climate

Demographics

Economy

The formal extraction of oil and gas reserves from the Alegria Oil Field Polyard-3 Well in Barangay Montpeller would generate numerous job opportunities and income for residents, neighboring towns and the entire Cebu province.

Extracted oil will be sold to power plants at US$70 per barrel with a current production of 200 to 300 barrels per day, as told by Country Manager Edgar Benedict Cutiongco of China International Mining and Petroleum Company Inc. (CIMP), the service contractor of the oil extraction project. The Municipal government will receive an 18% income share coming from the 60% allotted to the National Government, while 14% will go to Barangay Montpeller and 8% to the Provincial Government.

Tourism

The municipality of Alegria launched the Kawayan Festival on 2 December 2006, in time for the annual town fiesta. Local contingents paraded the streets, and locally produced kawayan (bamboo) products were on display.  Kawayan Festival has been part of the fiesta celebration in honor of Saint Francis Xavier since then.

There is also a plan to develop Alegria as the "Organic Vegetable Basket" in Cebu and in the Visayas region by its mayor, Verna Magallon.

See also
Municipalities of the Philippines
Legislative districts of Cebu

References

External links

 [ Philippine Standard Geographic Code]

Municipalities of Cebu